Chok Chai is a district (amphoe) in Nakhon Ratchasima province, northeastern Thailand.

History
The district was originally named Krathok (กระโทก). The government renamed it Chok Chai (meaning 'lucky victory') in 1945. The name was chosen to commemorate the victory of King Taksin the Great over the warlord of Phimai after the fall of Ayutthaya.

Geography
Neighboring districts are (from the north clockwise): Mueang Nakhon Ratchasima, Chaloem Phra Kiat, Nong Bun Mak, Khon Buri and Pak Thong Chai.

Administration

Central administration 
Chok Chai is divided into 10 sub-districts (tambons), which are further subdivided into 132 administrative villages (mubans).

Local administration 
There are three sub-district municipalities (thesaban tambons) in the district:
 Chok Chai consisting of parts of sub-districts Krathok and Chok Chai.
 Dan Kwian consisting of parts of sub-districts Tha Ang and Dan Kwian.
 Tha Yiam consisting of sub-district Tha Yiam.

There are nine sub-district administrative organizations (SAO) in the district:
 Krathok consisting of parts of sub-district Krathok.
 Phlapphla consisting of sub-district Phlapphla.
 Tha Ang consisting of parts of sub-district Tha Ang.
 Thung Arun consisting of sub-district Thung Arun.
 Tha Lat Khao consisting of sub-district Tha Lat Khao.
 Tha Chalung consisting of sub-district Tha Chalung.
 Chok Chai consisting of parts of sub-district Chok Chai.
 Lalom Mai Phatthana consisting of the sub-district Lalom Mai Phatthana.
 Dan Kwian consisting of parts of the sub-district Dan Kwian.

References

External links
amphoe.com (Thai)

Chok Chai